Samuel Cromwell Richardson (17 November 1917 – 8 October 1988) was a Canadian athlete who competed in the 1936 Summer Olympics. He was born in Toronto. In 1936 he was a member of the Canadian relay team which finished fifth in the Olympic 4x100 metre event. In the long jump competition he finished 14th and in the triple jump contest he finished 20th. At the 1934 British Empire Games he won the gold medal in the long jump event and the silver medal in the triple jump competition.

Richardson was of African American descent and the son of a World War I veteran.

There is some dispute about Richardson's date of birth, with various sources indicating that he may have been born in 1919 or even 1921.

References

External links
 

1917 births
1988 deaths
Canadian male long jumpers
Canadian male triple jumpers
Canadian male sprinters
Olympic track and field athletes of Canada
Athletes (track and field) at the 1936 Summer Olympics
Athletes (track and field) at the 1934 British Empire Games
Commonwealth Games gold medallists for Canada
Commonwealth Games silver medallists for Canada
Commonwealth Games medallists in athletics
Athletes from Toronto
People from Old Toronto
Black Canadian track and field athletes
Canadian people of African-American descent
Age controversies in sports
Medallists at the 1934 British Empire Games